Leptoconops longicauda is a species of biting midges belonging to the family Ceratopogonidae. This species occurs in the Wudang Mountains, Hubei province, China.

References

Insects of China
Leptoconops
Insects described in 1997